Herpetogramma elongalis is a moth in the family Crambidae. It was described by Warren in 1892. It is found in Taiwan.

References

Moths described in 1892
Herpetogramma
Moths of Taiwan